Five Live Yardbirds is the live debut album by English rock band the Yardbirds.  It features the group's interpretations of ten American blues and rhythm and blues songs, including their most popular live number, Howlin' Wolf's "Smokestack Lightning".  The album contains some of the earliest recordings with guitarist Eric Clapton.

Recorded at the Marquee Club in London on 20 March 1964, it was released in the United Kingdom by Columbia Records nine months later.  Despite several favourable retrospective reviews, the album did not reach the UK album charts.  It was not issued in the United States; however, four songs were included on the Yardbirds' second American album, Having a Rave Up.

Background and recording
In October 1963, the Yardbirds took over the Rolling Stones' position at the Crawdaddy Club and had signed a management contract with club owner Giorgio Gomelsky. After touring with Sonny Boy Williamson II, the band signed a contract with Columbia Records.  In 1964, they recorded two singles, "I Wish You Would" and "Good Morning Little Schoolgirl".  These had limited success and Gomelsky was able to persuade Columbia to release a live album as the Yardbirds' debut album.

The Yardbirds were a popular live attraction at music clubs.  Much of their reputation was built on their use of a "rave up" musical arrangement, an instrumental interlude that builds to a climax. Clapton credits the rave up to bassist Paul Samwell-Smith and explains: "While most other bands were playing three-minute songs, we were taking three-minute numbers and stretching them out to five or six minutes, during which time the audience would go crazy".  It was at such performances that Clapton often broke a guitar string.  While he was putting on a new one, the audience would slowly clap their hands (slow handclapping).  This led manager Gomelsky to nickname him "Eric 'Slowhand' Clapton".

Five Live Yardbirds was recorded at the Marquee Club in London.  Yardbirds' biographer Gregg Russo describes the conditions and equipment for recording at the club as less than ideal, but they were able to capitalise on their greater popularity compared to the Crawdaddy.  He adds:

Composition and musical style
All of the songs that appear on Five Live Yardbirds were written by American blues and rhythm and blues artists and several of the original recordings appeared on the American record charts.  The band's early material reflects the repertoires of the early British rhythm and blues groups, such as the Rolling Stones and the Animals.  Clapton biographer David Bowling described the album as "a lot of straight electric blues, but at times they come close to a rock sound."  Their version of Chuck Berry's "Too Much Monkey Business", which is the album opener, is the most rock-oriented song on the album.

Several songs feature extended instrumental improvisation.  Bo Diddley's "Here 'Tis" and the Isley Brothers' "Respectable" are high-energy tunes, which represent the use of the double-time feature of the rave up for the entire songs.  AllMusic critic Matthew Greenwald describes "Here 'Tis" as "driven by a furious "Bo Diddley" beat and rhythm ... Clapton's interplay with bassist Paul Samwell-Smith is one of the great moments in the band's recorded history". The instrumental spotlight was also shared with singer and blues harmonica player Keith Relf.  Clapton and Relf trading riffs is one of the highlights of "Smokestack Lightning".  The Howlin' Wolf song was the Yardbirds' most popular live number and a regular in their sets. Performances of the song could last up to 30 minutes.  Howlin' Wolf reportedly referred to the group's 5:35 album version as "the definitive version of his song".

The slow blues standard, "Five Long Years", features extended guitar soloing by Clapton in a style he further developed with John Mayall & the Bluesbreakers.  Clapton and Samwell-Smith share the lead vocals on "Good Morning Little Schoolgirl", which is based on the version by the American R&B duo Don and Bob. Bo Diddley's "I'm a Man" (which became a hit when the Yardbirds later recorded it with Jeff Beck) and songs by Slim Harpo and John Lee Hooker round out the album.

Release and critical reception

Clapton biographer Christopher Sandford notes, "When Five Live Yardbirds was released that winter, to generally favourable reviews ('Raucous interplay ... great guitar ...feral energy of the ensemble') it, too, failed to materially benefit [sic] the group." The album did not appear in British record charts. Subsequently, it was not issued in the US, but in November 1965 Epic Records (their American label) included four of the tracks on Having a Rave Up with the Yardbirds. In 1966, Epic planned to release the album in the US with the same tracks as the UK album (although with different cover art), but did not follow through. 

Later critics have given favourable reviews. AllMusic's Eder awarded it four and a half out of five stars and described it as "the first importantindeed, essentiallive album to come out of the 1960s British rock & roll boom. In terms of the performance captured and the recording quality, it was also the best such live record of the entire middle of the decade". In a separate review for AllMusic, Rick Clark noted "Smokestack Lightning" [and other songs] were open-ended improvisations that helped lay the groundwork for groups like Cream and the Jimi Hendrix Experience."  Bowling calls the material "raw and powerful" and Russo adds that it is "a completely faithful reproduction" of the group's early shows. Ultimate Classic Rock included the album in its list of "Top 100 Live Albums", calling it an "explosive document of a British blues band fueling a decidedly American music with power, fireworks and amped-up resourcefulness".

Aerosmith's Joe Perry described himself as "a huge fan of Clapton's work on Five Live Yardbirds. Their version of Chuck Berry's 'Too Much Monkey Business' was such a blueprint for a lot of what Aerosmith tried to do. The 'Rave Ups' [instrumental interludes] which were backing up Eric, the solosit was like the band was a slingshot and, as soon as it hit that pocket, he went sailing. Those parts of the songs still give me goosebumps."

Track listing

Personnel
The Yardbirds
Eric "Slowhand" Claptonlead guitar, co-lead vocals on "Good Morning Little Schoolgirl"
Chris Drejarhythm guitar
Jim McCartydrums
Keith Relflead vocals (except on "Good Morning Little Schoolgirl"), harmonica, maracas
Paul "Sam" Samwell-Smithbass guitar, co-lead vocals on "Good Morning Little Schoolgirl"

Production
Giorgio Gomelsky – producer, liner notes
Phillip Wood – engineer, sound effects engineer
Bill Inglot – digital remastering
Richard Rosser – photography

Footnotes

References

Bibliography

External links

The Yardbirds live albums
1964 debut albums
Albums produced by Giorgio Gomelsky
1964 live albums
Columbia Records live albums
Live albums recorded at The Marquee Club
Covers albums